

B

C

D

E

F

G

H

L

M

N

O

R

S

T

W

Roads in Carroll County, Maryland
Carroll